Hector Hall is a fictional character, a superhero appearing in DC Comics's Infinity, Inc., Sandman and JSA. He has gone by the names Silver Scarab, Sandman, and Doctor Fate.

Hector Hall appeared in the first season of the Netflix drama series The Sandman (2022), portrayed by Lloyd Everitt.

Publication history
Hector Hall first appeared in All-Star Squadron #25 and was created by writer Roy Thomas and artist Jerry Ordway.

Fictional character biography

Childhood
Hector Hall is the son of Carter and Shiera Hall, the Golden Age heroes known as Hawkman and Hawkgirl. Carter and Shiera were reincarnations of an ancient Egyptian pharaoh and his wife, both of whom had been killed and cursed by their rival Hath-Set. Unbeknownst to either of them, however, Hath-Set's curse also concerned any children that might be conceived by the pair. The curse of Seketh, the Ancient Egyptian God of Death, prophesied the combination of the Silver Scarab and the Eye of Ra, which would practically mean the end of the world. As such, when Hector was born during an archaeological dig near Cairo, he was born without a soul, destined to be a vessel for the Silver Scarab, an agent of vengeance called forth by Hath-Set.

To further anger Hector, his parents would frequently visit the city of Feithera and spend time with their godson Norda Cantrell (who would become Northwind). Although the two children would be playmates as well, Hector carried a grudge against Norda for his wings and the attention he got from Hector's parents. It turned out later that, as Hector had been prophesied to become an agent of Hath-Set, Norda's destiny would be to stop him.

Young Hector Hall would sometimes also play with the other children of the Justice Society, such as Al Rothstein (godchild of the first Atom), Lyta Trevor (child of the first Fury, who would grow up to marry Hector) and Rick Tyler (the son of the first Hourman). During one of these meetings, the kids ended up flying a jet, and almost crashed into the White House, where they were of course stopped and reprimanded by their parents.

The Silver Scarab

Feeling neglected by his crime-fighting parents, in college Hector constructed a suit out of the Nth Metal that granted his parents the power of flight, while also adding some solar improvements. Hector had enrolled at UCLA and met his childhood friend, Lyta Trevor. The two quickly fell in love and began to date. Lyta wished to follow in her mother's footsteps and become the next Fury, and Hector shared the secret of his Silver Scarab suit with her. As such, the two decided to apply for membership in the Justice Society of America, the group their parents had helped form. Inviting Al Rothstein to apply with them as well as Norda Cantrell, who would codename himself Northwind, all four were turned down due to their age and inexperience. Before the four could further plead their case, Jenny Hayden and Todd Rice, both Alan Scott's children, showed up and also applied. The six of them left, but shortly after, Henry King Jr. came to apply, using the illusion of his father, Brainwave. He quickly told them that he was the son of the original Brainwave and didn't want a fight, but the JSA attacked him regardless. Feeling pity on the youngsters, Star-Spangled Kid decided to leave the JSA with Brainwave, Jr. in order to create a new group. They were joined by Power Girl and the Huntress, and called themselves Infinity, Inc.

After battling their parents and mentors (who were under the influence of Koehaha, the River of Evil) the team publicly divulged their secret identities (revealing those of their parents in the process), and Hector also announced his engagement to Lyta. The Ultra-Humanite had already revealed Hawkman and Hawkgirl's secret identities, and Hector chose to confirm the rumor. They had little time to enjoy their happiness as the entity that had been within Hector since his birth came forth, thanks to the manipulation of Hath-Set. The reincarnated Silver Scarab fought Infinity, Inc. alongside Hath-Set and summoned the Eye of Ra. The heroes managed (largely thanks to the help of the returned Northwind) to win, but at the cost of Hector's life. As he died, he learned that Lyta was carrying his child, the one thing that was his undoing, for the child carried with him the purity and goodness of Hector Hall, resulting in the Silver Scarab being unable to fully control the Eye.

The Sandman

Hector Hall cheated death like his parents before. His consciousness had been cast into the Dreaming, where it was discovered by Brute and Glob, former servants of Morpheus, Dream of the Endless. Left at a loose end following the imprisonment of Morpheus in the early 20th century, Brute and Glob had taken to recruiting mortals as surrogate "dream kings", which they hoped to use as a means to seize control of the entire Dreaming. Hector was one such pawn, and he adopted the costumed identity of the Sandman. In his new persona, Hector could only leave his "dream dimension" for one hour a day.

He increasingly made use of this time to visit Lyta in her dreams, where he discovered that she had become pregnant with his child. This pattern continued for a long time before Hector was finally "caught" by his friend Al Rothstein, who had come to visit Lyta and propose to her. He told Lyta of his new role and asked her to marry him. She agreed, and the two of them departed for the dream dimension.

The "Dream Dimension" was nothing more than a part of the Dreaming inside the mind of a young boy named Jed Walker which Brute and Glob had severed. Inside, Lyta slowly started to drift off, becoming less and less in touch with reality, and her pregnancy had completely halted for nearly two years. Hector became more and more obsessed with his role as the Sandman, and devolved from a serious superhero to one who fought nonsensical battles against weak villains.

It was only a short time later that Morpheus escaped his captivity and set about putting the Dreaming back into order. Eventually, his attention fell on Brute and Glob. Ending their schemes, Morpheus returned Hector to the realm of the dead, and laid claim to his yet-to-be-born son, Daniel, who was destined to become the next Lord of Dreams.

Doctor Fate
Like his parents, Hector was in a reincarnation cycle. When he returned again several years later, he was chosen to adopt the vestments of Doctor Fate, a powerful sorcerer who had previously been a member of the Justice Society of America. As soon as he had adopted the vestments of Fate, he was forced to fight Mordru and was able to best him, capturing him inside the Amulet, thanks to the advice of Kent Nelson, who resided in the Amulet with his wife Inza.

The parents of Hector's current body are Hank Hall (no relation) and Dawn Granger, better known as the superheroes Hawk and Dove. Since they were empowered by the Lords of Chaos and Order respectively, the new Doctor Fate was, like Jared Stevens before him, an agent of balance.

While acting as Dr. Fate with the Justice Society, there was still a piece missing in Hector Hall's life, his wife. He and the team had traveled inside the Amulet of Anubis to find her, where Mordru revealed she was alive, and he returned to the place where he was reborn. There he found his second mother to be comatose, but concluded that Mordru had put up a spell of deception and that this woman was in fact Lyta. Hector sought his aid in reviving his wife from her coma with the JSA, and while he left her with them, he traveled to Thanagar. He came to rescue Hawkgirl and also witnessed the resurrection of his father.

Hector was unsuccessful in his attempts to wake Lyta. He learned from what he believed to be Nabu, to travel to Gemworld, where he would uncover the secret behind Mordru's spell. It turned out that the Amulet had been created on Gemworld, and that Nabu had come from a world known as Cilia, with the Amulet being all that is left of the planet. Similarly, he learned that Mordru was in fact not a corporeal being, but a form of body-hopping magical energy. Hector left Gemworld with this new knowledge, and took with him the skull of Lord Wrynn, a man who had been consumed by Mordru. Hector started to prepare for the ritual involving the skull, although Nabu disapproved, wanting Hector to study more.

At one point, the JSA confronted the Injustice Society, and after the elder heroes had been teleported away, the Spectre revealed himself and told them that they would have to fight a demon called Legacy. When Hector met with Nabu, he was confronted with his 'destiny': he was fated to kill Hawkgirl, after which he would be killed by his own father. Hector did not accept this destiny and instead swore that he would form his own path and fate. Hector and the rest of the JSA confronted Legacy who was revealed to be an old villain called Wizard, and they proceeded to beat him.

Afterwards, Hector returned to his goal of freeing Lyta. When he had undone Mordru's spell, he found that Mordru had placed another spell, and that the woman was in fact Dawn Granger. Rejoining the JSA, he became aggressive to both protestors and his own teammates. Hawkman ordered him to remove his helmet and to their shock, Mordru had managed to replace Hector under the helm of Fate. Hector was now imprisoned in the cell he had created for Mordru in the Amulet. The Agents of Order that had come before helped him and it was revealed that Mordru had been disguised as Nabu the entire time and that he had taken over the body of Arion, a Lord of Order. He was brought to the house of the Nelsons, where he was told his wife was dead, which he still refused to accept. Hector gathered his strength and managed to return to reality to confront Mordru. After showing Mordru his future, a future of humiliation and failure, Hector imprisoned Mordru within the Rock of Eternity at the end of the universe.

Hall had operated as Doctor Fate from Salem since then, with Nabu - again inhabiting the helm, but no longer controlling Fate - advising him. The Nelsons' souls still resided within the amulet, and they were occasionally able to contact the outside world (including Kent once having encountered the 1990s Starman). Hall's identity is known to a few who have figured it out, and in his secret identity, he socialized with some of the inhabitants of Salem, being on the whole more gregarious than his predecessors.

When faced with the monstrous magical might of the being known as the Curse (a being that Nabu himself had not been able to completely vanquish), Hector was killed. As his body lay dying in the streets of Salem, Hector's spirit met with Nabu inside the helmet. Nabu had been verbally abusing Hector ever since the latter had taken on the mantle (because even though Hector was stated to have the most power as Dr. Fate, he was not living up to his potential). Finally, after Nabu continued his assault, telling Hector he might as well die so another could claim the mantle, Hector finally had enough, decked Nabu and returned to his body. He was able to revive his body and ended up capable enough to beat the Curse. Now Hector was truly secure and confident in his role.

On a later adventure to Kahndaq with the JSA, Hector and Nabu clashed again, as Nabu took control of Doctor Fate, and worked against the JSA, stating that Hector was blindly following his father while Nabu argued that Black Adam's current agenda was justified. Hector, with the help of the Nelsons and the other previous incarnations of Fate, was able to trap Nabu in the Amulet and once again took control. At that same time, Hector's wife Lyta was revealed to have been imprisoned by Nabu to manipulate Hector. The couple were reunited as they appeared in Kahndaq again, just as Black Adam was defeated by the Justice Society.

Lyta and Hall returned to the Tower and lived happily, until they were trapped in a section of Hell by the Spectre, who was on a rampage to destroy all magic. The two were stranded on a frozen mountain, where Hector was forced to fend off various demons that threatened him and Lyta. Meanwhile, an unconscious Lyta was communicating with their son Daniel, Lord of the Dreaming. Daniel proposed they join him in the Dreaming and when Lyta woke up, Hector had collapsed near her, close to death. She decided to take him up on his offer. Together with Hector, they entered the portal to the Dreaming. As their physical bodies froze to death atop the mountain, their spirits joined their son.

Powers and abilities
 As the Silver Scarab, Hector wore a suit made of Nth metal.  This metal was developed by his father, Carter Hall, and improved upon by Hector. The suit enabled him to fly in space, and project solar-powered ray blasts. 
 As Sandman, Hector had extraordinary strength, the power of flight, and lived in a place called "The Dream Stream", which enabled him to see other people's dreams and he could project himself into the real world for one hour every twenty-four hours, and could travel through "The Dream Stream" almost immediately from anywhere in the real world to any other place during that one hour.
 As Dr. Fate, Hector possessed a wide variety of powers. In general, he could fly, was resistant to damage, and had greater-than-human strength. Hall was able to "speak" with Nabu, the previous Doctors Fate, Kid Eternity, and Lyta through the helmet of Nabu, which gave him access to a wide variety of spells. He was susceptible to toxins in the air, however.

At his most potent, Fate is an accomplished sorcerer, able to match most other wizards in the DC Universe, but not as powerful as true extra-human beings such as the Spectre. Fate has been observed throwing bolts of mystical energy, crafting solid objects out of energy, and transforming objects into other kinds of matter. The full limits of his magical skills are unknown.

In other media
 Hector Hall appears in the TV adaptation of The Sandman, portrayed by Lloyd Everitt.

References

DC Comics male superheroes
Earth-Two
DC Comics characters who use magic
Fictional wizards
The Sandman (comic book)
DC Comics fantasy characters
Comics characters introduced in 1983
Characters created by Roy Thomas
Characters created by Jerry Ordway
Doctor Fate